An Sang-mi (born 12 November 1979) is a retired South Korean short track speed skater.

She won a gold medal in the 3000 m relay at the 1998 Winter Olympics, together with teammates Chun Lee-kyung, Won Hye-kyung and Kim Yun-mi.

References

External links
 
 CyberScoreboard biography
 
 

1979 births
Living people
South Korean female short track speed skaters
Olympic short track speed skaters of South Korea
Olympic gold medalists for South Korea
Olympic medalists in short track speed skating
Short track speed skaters at the 1998 Winter Olympics
Medalists at the 1998 Winter Olympics
Asian Games medalists in short track speed skating
Short track speed skaters at the 1996 Asian Winter Games
Short track speed skaters at the 1999 Asian Winter Games
Sportspeople from Daegu
Medalists at the 1996 Asian Winter Games
Medalists at the 1999 Asian Winter Games
Asian Games gold medalists for South Korea
Asian Games silver medalists for South Korea
Universiade medalists in short track speed skating
Universiade gold medalists for South Korea
Universiade bronze medalists for South Korea
Competitors at the 2001 Winter Universiade
20th-century South Korean women
21st-century South Korean women